Middle Green is a hamlet in the civil parish of Wexham (where the 2011 Census population was included) in Buckinghamshire, England. It is located within the Metropolitan Green Belt bordering the north-east edge of Slough and close to the Slough Arm of the Grand Union Canal. Just to the south of the hamlet is the Middlegreen Trading Estate.

Hamlets in Buckinghamshire